The 2020 season is Wigan Warriors's 40th consecutive season playing in England's top division of rugby league. During the season, they competed in the Super League XXV and the 2020 Challenge Cup.

Preseason  friendlies

The 2020 pre-season saw three matches played including a testimonial, against Leeds Rhinos, for academy graduate Liam Farrell who has been playing for the first team since the 2010 season. The first match against the London Skolars was a continuation of an annual event between the Warriors and Skolars, resulting in a 70-6 win by the away side. The second match against the Leeds Rhinos resulted in a 10-22 loss for Wigan. The final match against derby rivals Leigh Centurions, ended in a 6-12 loss for the Warriors.

Super League

Source:

Regular season

Matches

  

All fixtures are subject to change

League table

Play-offs

  

All fixtures are subject to change

Challenge Cup

  

All fixtures are subject to change

Transfers

In

Out

Loans Out

Squad

Notes

References

Wigan Warriors seasons
Super League XXV by club